The Women's Champions Invitational was a round-robin tournament played at the 2007 US Open tennis championships in New York City, USA. Four former tennis champions ("Legends") – Iva Majoli of Croatia, Conchita Martínez of Spain, Martina Navratilova of the US, and Jana Novotná of the Czech Republic  – played off against one another to determine the winner. Martínez and Novotná tied for the championship.

Draw

Round robin

Champions
 Conchita Martínez and  Jana Novotná

Women's Champions Invitational